Medhi Amine El Mouttaqi Benatia (born 17 April 1987) is a former professional footballer who played as a centre back. Well known for his tenures throughout France, Italy, and Germany; Benatia represented Morocco at the international level, for whom he made 66 international appearances, and most notably captained them to their first World Cup in 20 years.

Benatia began his career at Marseille, spending his time loaned out to Tours and Lorient before joining Clermont in 2008. Two years later he joined Udinese, spending three seasons there before transferring to Roma. After helping them finish as Serie A runners-up in his only campaign there, he was signed by Bayern Munich for €26 million, winning the Bundesliga in both of his seasons. In 2016 he moved to Juventus, initially on loan, and was later signed permanently by the club in 2017.

Born and raised in France, Benatia initially represented his birth nation at under-18 level. He then chose to represent his father's Morocco at under-20 level, making his senior international debut in 2008. Benatia represented Morocco at four Africa Cup of Nations tournaments and the 2018 FIFA World Cup. In 2019, Benatia announced his retirement from international football, having earned 66 caps.

Early life
Benatia was born in Courcouronnes, France, to a Moroccan father and an Algerian mother.

Club career

Marseille
Benatia joined Marseille in 2003, and signed his first professional contract with them two years later. After loan spells at Tours and Lorient, he left for Ligue 2 club Clermont on 1 July 2008 on a free transfer.

Udinese
On 1 July 2010, Benatia signed for Serie A club Udinese Calcio, again on a free transfer. He made 80 league appearances for Udinese, scoring six goals.

Roma
On 13 July 2013, Benatia signed for Roma on a five-year contract in a €13.5 million transfer, with Nico López and Valerio Verre going the other way on co-ownership as part of the same deal. On 26 September, Benatia scored his first goal for the club in a 2–0 victory against Sampdoria. After further goals against Bologna, Catania. and Chievo Verona in the second half of the season, he ended the season with five goals from 33 games.

Bayern Munich

On 27 August 2014, Bayern Munich announced that they had signed Benatia on a five-year deal for a fee of €26 million. Bayern Munich beat Manchester City, Chelsea, Barcelona and Real Madrid, who were said to be also interested in signing him. He admitted he was disappointed to leave Roma but was told he had to go because the club needed the money. Upon hearing this, Roma President James Pallotta was furious and responded by saying he was sold for being a "poisonous liar".

On 17 September 2014, Benatia made his official debut for Bayern in a 1–0 home win against Manchester City, for the opening match of the 2014–15 UEFA Champions League season, where he played for 85 minutes, completing 93% of his passes. In the return match at Manchester City, he was sent off in the 20th minute for denying Sergio Agüero a clear goalscoring opportunity; the subsequent penalty was converted by Agüero and City went on to win 3–2.

Benatia scored his first goal for Bayern on 13 December, opening the scoring in a 4–0 win at FC Augsburg with a header; this result put his club 10 points clear at the top of the Bundesliga table. On 12 May 2015, Benatia scored his first Champions League goal, heading Bayern into the lead in their Champions League semi-final second leg against Barcelona; although his team won 3–2, they were eliminated 5–3 on aggregate.

He started the 2015–16 season in the German Super Cup, which Bayern lost in a penalty shootout after a 1–1 draw at VfL Wolfsburg. On 14 August, he headed Xabi Alonso's free kick for the first goal of the new Bundesliga season in a 5–0 thrashing of Hamburger SV.

Juventus

On 15 July 2016, Italian champions Juventus signed Benatia on a season-long loan for €3 million, with an option to buy for an extra €17 million at the end of season. He made his club debut on 27 August, in a 1–0 away win over Lazio in Serie A.

On 10 March 2017, Benatia scored his first goal for Juventus in a 2–1 win over A.C. Milan in Serie A, at the Juventus Stadium. On 12 May, Juventus exercised the option to permanently sign Benatia until 2020.

In May 2017, Benatia walked out of an interview with television channel RAI Due when he heard racist abuse towards him in his earpiece. The company apologised.

On 11 April 2018, Juventus were leading 3–0 away to Real Madrid in the quarter-finals of the Champions League, a score that would have taken the game to extra time as Juventus lost the first leg at home 3–0. Referee Michael Oliver awarded a 93rd minute injury time penalty to Real Madrid after Benatia challenged Lucas Vázquez in the box; the penalty was subsequently converted by Cristiano Ronaldo for a final 4–3 aggregate loss. Benatia said after the game that Oliver's call made him "more and more disgusted by the world of football". On 9 May, he scored twice in Juventus's 4–0 victory over Milan in the 2018 Coppa Italia Final, at the Stadio Olimpico in Rome.

Al-Duhail
After making only five Serie A appearances during the first half of the 2018–19 season, in January 2019, it was reported that Benatia had completed a move to Qatar Stars League club Al-Duhail. On 28 January, Juventus announced the transfer fee, which was €8 million plus a maximum of €2 million in bonuses. He made his debut for Al-Duhail on 16 February, in a 1–0 home win over Al Sailiya in the Qatar Stars League.

Fatih Karagümrük
In the summer of 2021, he moved to Süper Lig club Fatih Karagümrük. He made six league appearances before retiring from professional football on 9 December 2021.

International career

Benatia made his international debut for Morocco on 19 November 2008 in a 3–0 friendly win over Zambia at the Stade Mohammed V in Casablanca. He scored his first goal for them on 4 June 2011, opening a 4–0 win over rivals Algeria at the Stade de Marrakech, in qualification for the 2012 Africa Cup of Nations.

He was part of their squad at the final tournament in Equatorial Guinea and Gabon, and played in their first two matches of an eventual group stage exit, defeats to Tunisia and Gabon.

Benatia was Morocco's captain at the 2017 Africa Cup of Nations in Gabon and played every minute until the 1–0 elimination by Egypt in the quarter-finals. In March that year, he dropped himself from the national team until he became a regular for Juventus, stating "I think it’s unfair to come and play for the national team when I lack competitive football and take the place of someone who is in a better position". On 11 November, he scored in a 2–0 win away to the Ivory Coast that qualified the Atlas Lions to the 2018 FIFA World Cup, their first such tournament for 20 years. He called it "the most beautiful moment of my career".

Benatia retired from international duty in October 2019, having also played at the 2018 World Cup and 2019 Africa Cup of Nations.

Style of play
A tall, large, strong, and athletic defender, with good technique, ball-playing ability, defensive skills, and an ability to organise his defence; during his time in Italy, Benatia earned a reputation as one of the best centre-backs in Serie A. He was known in particular for his tackling and ability in the air.

Career statistics

Club

International

Scores and results list Morocco's goal tally first, score column indicates score after each Benatia goal.

Honours

Marseille
 UEFA Intertoto Cup: 2005
Bayern Munich
 Bundesliga: 2014–15, 2015–16
 DFB-Pokal: 2015–16

Juventus
 Serie A: 2016–17, 2017–18, 2018–19
 Coppa Italia: 2016–17, 2017–18
 Supercoppa Italiana: 2018
 UEFA Champions League runner-up: 2016–17

Al-Duhail
 Qatar Stars League: 2019–20
 Qatar Emir Cup: 2019–20
 Qatar Cup runner-up: 2020

Individual
 CAF Team of the Year: 2013, 2014, 2015, 2018
 Mars d'Or (Best Moroccan Player): 2013, 2014
 El Heddaf Arab Footballer of the Year: 2015
 A.S. Roma Player of the Season: 2013–14
"Gran Galà del calcio AIC" Best Central Defender: 2014
 European Sports Media's European Team of the Season: 2013–14
 Serie A Team of the Year: 2013–14
Qatar Stars League Team of the Year: 2019–20
 Globe Soccer Awards Best Arab Player of the Year: 2014
France Football Africa Team of the Year: 2017
Goal Africa Team of the Year: 2018
 IFFHS CAF Men's Team of the Decade 2011–2020
 IFFHS All-time Morocco Men's Dream Team

Notes

References

External links

1987 births
Living people
Footballers from Essonne
Moroccan footballers
Morocco youth international footballers
Morocco international footballers
French footballers
France youth international footballers
Moroccan people of Algerian descent
French sportspeople of Moroccan descent
French sportspeople of Algerian descent
Citizens of Morocco through descent
2012 Africa Cup of Nations players
2013 Africa Cup of Nations players
2017 Africa Cup of Nations players
INF Clairefontaine players
Ligue 1 players
Ligue 2 players
Bundesliga players
Serie A players
Qatar Stars League players
Süper Lig players
Tours FC players
FC Lorient players
Clermont Foot players
Udinese Calcio players
Olympique de Marseille players
A.S. Roma players
FC Bayern Munich footballers
Juventus F.C. players
Al-Duhail SC players
Fatih Karagümrük S.K. footballers
2018 FIFA World Cup players
Association football central defenders
2019 Africa Cup of Nations players
Moroccan expatriate footballers
French expatriate footballers
Expatriate footballers in Germany
Expatriate footballers in Italy
Expatriate footballers in Qatar
Expatriate footballers in Turkey
Moroccan expatriate sportspeople in Germany
Moroccan expatriate sportspeople in Italy
Moroccan expatriate sportspeople in Qatar
Moroccan expatriate sportspeople in Turkey